The Osgodby Hoard is a Romano-British hoard of coins and metalwork found near Osgodby, Lincolnshire in 1999. The hoard was discovered in 1999 during engineering works on farmland and comprises 44 coins, a brooch and an intaglio. It is now in the collection of the British Museum.

References

1999 in England
1999 archaeological discoveries
Archaeological sites in Lincolnshire
Hoards from Roman Britain
Coin hoards